The 2019 AFC Asian Cup qualification was the qualification process organized by the Asian Football Confederation (AFC) to determine the participating teams for the 2019 AFC Asian Cup, the 17th edition of the international men's football championship of Asia. For the first time, the Asian Cup final tournament was contested by 24 teams, having been expanded from the 16-team format that was used from 2004 to 2015.

The qualification process involved four rounds, where the first two doubled as the 2018 FIFA World Cup qualification for Asian teams.

Format
The qualification structure was as follows:
First round: A total of twelve teams (teams ranked 35–46) played home-and-away over two legs. The six winners advanced to the second round.
Second round: A total of forty teams (teams ranked 1–34 and six first round winners) were divided into eight groups of five teams to play home-and-away round-robin matches.
The eight group winners and the four best group runners-up including host UAE qualified for the AFC Asian Cup finals.
The next sixteen highest ranked teams (the remaining four group runners-up, the eight third-placed teams and the four best group fourth-placed teams) advanced directly to the third round of Asian Cup qualification.
The remaining twelve teams entered the play-off round to contest the remaining eight spots in the third round of Asian Cup qualification.
Play-off round: At a Competition Committee meeting in November 2014, it was decided that a play-off round of qualifying would be introduced into the qualification procedure. There were two rounds of home-and-away two-legged play-off matches to determine the final eight qualifiers for the third round.
Third round: The 24 teams were divided into six groups of four to play home-and-away round-robin matches, and they competed for the remaining slots of the 2019 AFC Asian Cup.

The play-off round represented a change from the initially announced qualification format – which saw the remaining fourth-placed teams and the four best group fifth-placed teams also advance to the third round.

Entrants
46 FIFA-affiliated nations from the AFC entered qualification. In order to determine which nations would compete in the first round and which nations would receive a bye through to the second round, the FIFA World Rankings of January 2015 were used (shown in parentheses).

Due to the joint format of the FIFA World Cup qualifiers and AFC Asian Cup qualifiers, the hosts of the 2019 AFC Asian Cup, the United Arab Emirates also entered the second round of AFC Asian Cup qualifiers despite having qualified automatically.

Northern Mariana Islands, which is not a FIFA member, were not eligible to enter.

Schedule
The schedule of the qualification competition was as follows.

First round

The draw for the first round was held on 10 February 2015, 15:30 MST (UTC+8), at the AFC House in Kuala Lumpur, Malaysia.

The six teams eliminated from this stage progressed to the 2016 AFC Solidarity Cup.

Second round

The draw for the second round was held on 14 April 2015, 17:00 MST (UTC+8), at the JW Marriott Hotel in Kuala Lumpur, Malaysia.

Groups

Group A

Group B

Group C

Group D

Group E

Group F
Indonesia was also drawn into this group, but on 30 May 2015 the country's football association was suspended due to governmental interference, and on 3 June 2015 the team was disqualified and all matches involving it were cancelled.

Group G

Group H

Ranking of runner-up teams
To determine the four best runner-up teams, the following criteria are used:
 Points (3 points for a win, 1 point for a draw, 0 points for a loss)
 Goal difference
 Goals scored
 Fair play points
 Drawing of lots

As a result of Indonesia being disqualified due to FIFA suspension, Group F contained only four teams compared to five teams in all other groups. Therefore, the results against the fifth-placed team were not counted when determining the ranking of the runner-up teams.

Ranking of fourth-placed teams
To determine the four best fourth-placed teams, the following criteria were used:
 Points (3 points for a win, 1 point for a draw, 0 points for a loss)
 Goal difference
 Goals scored
 Fair play points
 Drawing of lots

As a result of Indonesia being disqualified due to FIFA suspension, Group F contained only four teams compared to five teams in all other groups. Therefore, the results against the fifth-placed team are not counted when determining the ranking of the fourth-placed teams.

Play-off round

At an AFC Competition Committee meeting in November 2014, it was decided that two rounds of play-off matches would be introduced into the qualification procedure to determine the final eight teams for the main qualifying round.

A total of eight slots for the third round were available from this round (five from round 1, three from round 2). The three teams eliminated from this stage progressed to the 2016 AFC Solidarity Cup.

The draw for the play-off round was held on 7 April 2016, 15:00 MYT (UTC+8), at the AFC House in Kuala Lumpur, Malaysia.

Round 1
The lowest seeded team, Bhutan, received a bye, and the remaining ten teams were drawn into five pairs. Each pair played two home-and-away matches, with the winners qualifying for the third round.

Round 2
The five losers from round 1 joined Bhutan in this round. The six teams were drawn into three pairs. Each pair played two home-and-away matches, with the winners qualifying for the third round.

Third round

A total of 24 teams competed in the third round of AFC Asian Cup qualifiers. Since the 2019 hosts United Arab Emirates advanced to the third round of the 2018 FIFA World Cup qualifiers, the automatic slot for the hosts was no longer necessary, and a total of 12 slots for the AFC Asian Cup were available from this round.

Due to the withdrawal of Guam and the suspension of Kuwait, the AFC decided to invite both Nepal and Macau, the top two teams of the 2016 AFC Solidarity Cup, to re-enter 2019 AFC Asian Cup qualification as replacements in order to maintain 24 teams in the third round of the competition.

The draw for the third round was held on 23 January 2017, 16:00 GST, in Abu Dhabi, United Arab Emirates. The 24 teams were drawn into six groups of four.

Groups

Group A

Group B

Group C

Group D

Group E

Group F

Qualified teams

The following 24 teams qualified for the final tournament.

Notes:
1 Bold indicates champion for that year. Italic indicates host for that year.
2 As South Vietnam

Goalscorers

14 goals

 Mohammad Al-Sahlawi

11 goals

 Ahmed Khalil

10 goals

 Hamza Al-Dardour
 Anton Zemlianukhin

9 goals

 Manuchekhr Dzhalilov

8 goals

 Tim Cahill
 Yang Xu
 Sunil Chhetri
 Khalid Al-Hajri
 Abdulaziz Al-Muqbali

7 goals

 Chencho Gyeltshen
 Jeje Lalpekhlua
 Sardar Azmoun
 Hassan Maatouk
 Ali Ashfaq
 Jonathan Cantillana
 Sameh Maraaba
 Omar Khribin

6 goals

 Yu Dabao
 Keisuke Honda
 Naiz Hassan
 Kim Yu-song
 Son Heung-min

5 goals

 Tom Rogic
 Chen Po-liang
 Mehdi Taremi
 Shinji Kagawa
 Hassan Abdel-Fattah
 Kyaw Ko Ko
 Jong Il-gwan
 Pak Kwang-ryong
 Ahmed Mubarak Al-Mahaijri
 Phil Younghusband
 Abdelatif Bahdari
 Ahmad Abu Nahyeh
 Hassan Al-Haidos
 Taisir Al-Jassim
 Ali Mabkhout
 Sardor Rashidov
 Abdulwasea Al-Matari

4 goals

 Mile Jedinak
 Mahdi Abduljabbar
 Wu Chun-ching
 Younis Mahmoud
 Shinji Okazaki
 Munther Abu Amarah
 Abdallah Deeb
 Bader Al-Mutawa
 Yousef Nasser
 Vitalij Lux
 Yashir Pinto
 Tamer Seyam
 Javier Patiño
 Boualem Khoukhi
 Mohammed Muntari
 Mohammed Musa
 Osama Omari
 Akhtam Nazarov
 Parvizdzhon Umarbayev
 Igor Sergeev

3 goals

 Khaibar Amani
 Nathan Burns
 Ismail Abdullatif
 Abdulla Yusuf Helal
 Tshering Dorji
 Chan Vathanaka
 Jiang Ning
 Jaimes McKee
 Maya Yoshida
 Yaseen Al-Bakhit
 Odai Al-Saify
 Khampheng Sayavutthi
 Rabih Ataya
 Hilal El-Helwe
 Ahmad Hazwan Bakri
 Ali Fasir
 Aung Thu
 Ri Hyok-chol
 Misagh Bahadoran
 Iain Ramsay
 Ali Assadalla
 Yahya Al-Shehri
 Safuwan Baharudin
 Fazrul Nawaz
 Kwon Chang-hoon
 Lee Jae-sung
 Sanharib Malki
 Mahmoud Maowas
 Teerasil Dangda
 Arslanmyrat Amanow
 Altymyrat Annadurdyýew
 Omar Abdulrahman
 Odil Ahmedov
 Lê Công Vinh
 Nguyễn Văn Toàn

2 goals

 Norlla Amiri
 Jabar Sharza
 Mustafa Zazai
 Massimo Luongo
 Mark Milligan
 Aaron Mooy
 Abdulwahab Al-Malood
 Mohamed Al Romaihi
 Sayed Mohamed Adnan
 Abdulla Yaser
 Khoun Laboravy
 Prak Mony Udom
 Wang Yongpo
 Wu Lei
 Yu Hanchao
 Chu En-le
 Godfred Karikari
 Lam Ka Wai
 Sandesh Jhingan
 Balwant Singh
 Ashkan Dejagah
 Ehsan Hajsafi
 Ali Adnan
 Justin Meram
 Mu Kanazaki
 Ahmed Samir
 Mirlan Murzaev
 Khonesavanh Sihavong
 Hassan Chaito
 Mohammed Ghaddar
 Ali Hamam
 Niki Torrão
 Mohd Amri Yahyah
 Safawi Rasid
 Ahmed Nashid
 Sithu Aung
 Sami Al-Hasani
 Amad Al-Hosni
 Mohsin Al-Khaldi
 Raed Ibrahim Saleh
 Jaka Ihbeisheh
 Ahmad Maher Wridat
 Mahmoud Yousef
 Karim Boudiaf
 Mohammed Kasola
 Fahad Al-Muwallad
 Khairul Amri
 Jang Hyun-soo
 Ki Sung-yueng
 Koo Ja-cheol
 Suk Hyun-jun
 Abdelrazaq Al Hussain
 Raja Rafe
 Jahongir Ergashev
 Dilshod Vasiev
 Pokklaw Anan
 Theerathon Bunmathan
 Adisak Kraisorn
 Mongkol Tossakrai
 Chiquito do Carmo
 Ramon Saro
 Guwanç Abylow
 Ruslan Mingazow
 Wahyt Orazsähedow
 Myrat Ýagşyýew
 Alexander Geynrikh
 Anzur Ismailov
 Nguyễn Anh Đức
 Nguyễn Văn Quyết
 Ahmed Al-Sarori
 Ala Al-Sasi

1 goal

 Hassan Amin
 Zohib Islam Amiri
 Zubayr Amiri
 Faysal Shayesteh
 Josef Shirdel
 Mathew Leckie
 Tommy Oar
 Komail Al-Aswad
 Sami Al-Husaini
 Hussain Ali Baba
 Sayed Reda Issa
 Ali Jaafar Mohamed Madan
 Abdullah Omar
 Jamal Rashid
 Jahid Hasan Ameli
 Mamunul Islam
 Biren Basnet
 Jigme Dorji
 Karma Shedrup Tshering
 Adi Said
 Thierry Bin
 Chhin Chhoeun
 Hong Pheng
 Keo Sokpheng
 Sos Suhana
 Huang Bowen
 Mei Fang
 Zhang Linpeng
 Zhang Xizhe
 Chen Chao-an
 Xavier Chen
 Chen Hao-wei
 Chen Yi-wei
 Huang Wei-min
 Hung Kai-chun
 Wang Rui
 Wen Chih-hao
 Yaki Yen
 Brandon McDonald
 Travis Nicklaw
 Christian Annan
 Bai He
 Chan Siu Ki
 Ju Yingzhi
 Lo Kwan Yee
 Paulinho
 Sandro
 Tan Chun Lok
 Jordi Tarrés
 Xu Deshuai
 Fulganco Cardozo
 Sumit Passi
 Mohammed Rafique
 Robin Singh
 Rowllin Borges
 Karim Ansarifard
 Saeid Ezatolahi
 Jalal Hosseini
 Alireza Jahanbakhsh
 Kamal Kamyabinia
 Morteza Pouraliganji
 Ramin Rezaeian
 Masoud Shojaei
 Andranik Teymourian
 Mehdi Torabi
 Mohannad Abdul-Raheem
 Ali Hosni
 Dhurgham Ismail
 Mahdi Kamel
 Ahmed Yasin
 Genki Haraguchi
 Hiroshi Kiyotake
 Masato Morishige
 Takashi Usami
 Yousef Al-Naber
 Yousef Al-Rawashdeh
 Mohannad Al-Souliman
 Musa Al-Taamari
 Baha' Faisal
 Saeed Murjan
 Ali Maqseed
 Aziz Mashaan
 Faisal Zayid
 Ildar Amirov
 Azamat Baymatov
 Edgar Bernhardt
 Bakhtiyar Duyshobekov
 Viktor Maier
 Almazbek Mirzaliev
 Bekzhan Sagynbaev
 Islam Shamshiev
 Roda Antar
 Abbas Ahmed Atwi
 Samir Ayass
 Nour Mansour
 Youssef Mohamad
 Joan Oumari
 Feiz Shamsin
 Chan Pak Chun
 Carlos Leonel
 Leong Ka Hang
 Baddrol Bakhtiar
 Chanturu Suppiah
 Khair Jones
 Mahali Jasuli
 Mohd Safiq Rahim
 Safee Sali
 Syafiq Ahmad
 Syazwan Zainon
 Ahmed Abdulla
 Asadhulla Abdulla
 Ibrahim Waheed Hassan
 Hamza Mohamed
 Hussain Niyaz Mohamed
 Hussain Sifaau Yoosuf
 Batmönkhiin Erkhembayar
 Kyaw Zayar Win
 Kyi Lin
 Min Min Thu
 Suan Lam Mang
 Yan Naing Oo
 Zaw Min Tun
 Bimal Gharti Magar
 Bishal Rai
 Nawayug Shrestha
 Jang Kuk-chol
 Kim Yong-il
 Ri Yong-jik
 Ro Hak-su
 So Hyon-uk
 So Kyong-jin
 Mohammed Al-Ghassani
 Saad Al-Mukhaini
 Said Al-Ruzaiqi
 Jameel Al-Yahmadi
 Salaah Al-Yahyaei
 Nadir Mabrook
 Qasim Said
 Hassan Bashir
 Mus'ab Al-Batat
 Ahmed Awad
 Abdullah Jaber
 Matías Jadue
 Mohammad Natour
 Khaled Salem
 Pablo Tamburrini
 Khader Yousef
 Kevin Ingreso
 Manuel Ott
 Mike Ott
 Daisuke Sato
 Stephan Schröck
 James Younghusband
 Ahmed Abdul Maqsoud
 Akram Afif
 Abdelkarim Hassan
 Ismaeel Mohammad
 Sebastián Soria
 Salman Al-Faraj
 Osama Hawsawi
 Naif Hazazi
 Irfan Fandi
 Hariss Harun
 Faris Ramli
 Shakir Hamzah
 Lee Chung-yong
 Lee Jeong-hyeop
 Nam Tae-hee
 Subash Madushan
 Moayad Ajan
 Oday Al-Jafal
 Ahmad Kallasi
 Omar Midani
 Nuriddin Davronov
 Davron Ergashev
 Fatkhullo Fatkhuloev
 Umedzhon Sharipov
 Tana Chanabut
 Kroekrit Thaweekarn
 Patrick Fabiano
 Rufino Gama
 Jairo Neto
 José Oliveira
 Rodrigo Silva
 Serdaraly Ataýew
 Artur Geworkýan
 Süleýman Muhadow
 Mekan Saparow
 Mohamed Ahmed
 Ismail Al Hammadi
 Ahmed Al Hashmi
 Habib Fardan
 Abdullah Mousa
 Mohanad Salem
 Stanislav Andreev
 Server Djeparov
 Azizbek Haydarov
 Eldor Shomurodov
 Đinh Thanh Trung
 Đinh Tiến Thành
 Mạc Hồng Quân
 Nguyễn Công Phượng
 Nguyễn Quang Hải
 Trần Phi Sơn
 Ayman Al-Hagri
 Mudir Al-Radaei
 Akram Al-Worafi
 Mohammed Boqshan
 Tawfiq Ali Mansour

1 own goal

 Sharif Mukhammad
 Biren Basnet
 Khoun Laboravy
 Leng Makara
 Chen Chia-chun
 Mohannad Al-Souliman
 Ildar Amirov
 Valery Kichin
 Ali Hamam
 Lam Ka Seng
 Amdhan Ali
 Mohamed Faisal
 Ali Samooh
 Zaw Min Tun
 Hamdi Al Masri
 Davron Ergashev
 Serdar Annaorazow
 Mekan Saparow
 Đinh Tiến Thành

See also
2018 FIFA World Cup qualification (AFC)

Notes

References

External links
, the-AFC.com
Preliminary Joint Qualification 2018, stats.the-AFC.com
AFC Asian Cup UAE 2019, stats.the-AFC.com

 
Qualification
2019
2015 in Asian football
2016 in Asian football
2017 in Asian football
2018 in Asian football